The encyclopedic novel is a literary concept popularised by Edward Mendelson in two 1976 essays ("Encyclopedic Narrative" and "Gravity's Encyclopedia"). In Mendelson's formulation, encyclopedic novels "attempt to render the full range of knowledge and beliefs of a national culture, while identifying the ideological perspectives from which that culture shapes and interprets its knowledge". In more general terms, the encyclopedic novel is a long, complex work of fiction that incorporates extensive information (which is sometimes fictional itself), often from specialized disciplines of science and the humanities. Mendelson's essays examine the encyclopedic tendency in the history of literature, considering the Divine Comedy, Don Quixote, Faust, Moby-Dick, and War and Peace, with an emphasis on the modern Ulysses and Gravity's Rainbow. Commonly cited examples of encyclopedic novels in the postmodern period include, in addition to Pynchon, Richard Powers' The Gold Bug Variations (1991), David Foster Wallace's Infinite Jest (1996), and Don DeLillo's Underworld (1997). Other literary critics have explored the concept since, attempting to understand the function and effect of "encyclopedic" narratives.

Mendelson

Mendelson describes numerous qualities of the encyclopedic novel: they include "the full account of at least one technology or science" and the display of "an encyclopedia of literary styles, ranging from the most primitive and anonymous levels ... to the most esoteric of high styles". He notes that there is often a short but significant interval between the era portrayed in the novel and the era of the novel's writing (as in, for example, James Joyce's Ulysses, and Thomas Pynchon's Gravity's Rainbow). Mendelson states that "[b]ecause they are the products of an epic in which the world's knowledge is larger than any one person can encompass, they necessarily make extensive use of synecdoche". Orderly plot structures are often absent.

Other perspectives

There has been considerable debate about the nature and function of the encyclopedic novel since Mendelson's exposition of the concept. Hillary A. Clark attributes to this type of discourse the importance of ordering the information which the writer discovers and retrieves. Moreover, Clark points out that encyclopedic texts have a long history, from the Renaissance Divine Comedy of Dante to Ezra Pound's  modernist The Cantos. She explains that the urge to order the sum of all knowledge grew exponentially during the Renaissance and that by the 20th century we see writers such as Pound and James Joyce (whose Finnegans Wake is an example of an encyclopedic novel) simply recycling narratives. The encyclopedist's essential job regardless of the type of discourse, is to gather, recycle, and restate. The encyclopedic writer "returns to the role of the medieval scribe … reading and copying the already known, the popular, as well as the esoteric," and hence the encyclopedic novel assumes an almost "anti-creative" function.

The illusion of encyclopedism experienced by the reader of such a novel might represent the author's exploration of the assumptions and practices embodied in the production of a real encyclopedia. Along these lines, a post-structuralist analysis of the encyclopedic novel sees it as critical of encyclopedism, the ostensible goal of which is to capture the sum of all human knowledge. This critique suggests that the encyclopedic project is "tainted by its association with master narratives" and that it reinforces the "illusion of a totalizing system" of knowledge.  Encyclopedic novels in this view are commentaries on the limits of such narratives and systems. Given that the aura of encyclopedism in a work of fiction is necessarily an illusion, it points to a failure—a "failure" which may align with a novelistic intent to "highlight the illusory basis of 'total knowledge'". From this perspective, encyclopedic fiction suggests that "we should not systematically encyclopedize but seek more 'open' approaches to knowledge". On the other hand, Gustave Flaubert's encyclopedic Bouvard et Pécuchet appears to achieve an opposite goal: in his relentless encyclopedic presentation of "facts and theories", the two main characters, Bouvard and Pécuchet, appear to be so absorbed in a world of knowledge, of having to gain knowledge, of needing to put knowledge to practical purpose, that Flaubert appears to suggest the civilization they inhabit lacks creativity and art.

While an encyclopedia is a factual reference work, a novel stands in opposition to it as a "literary nonreferential narrative". One critical review questions why a novelist would paradoxically reference a fictional universe, and what literary purpose is served by the proliferation of the "junk text" that is often a carrier of the encyclopedic conceit. When excessive real-world data is presented to the reader, the author's purpose is unclear: those readers who already know the material will find it superfluous, and those who do not know it may find that it adds nothing of interest to the text. Giving examples of "junk text" in encyclopedic fiction, the review cites "the pseudo-scientific cetology chapter" in Moby-Dick and "minor-character chatter about art and economics" in William Gaddis's The Recognitions (1955) and J R (1975). Yet, a defining characteristic of the encyclopedic novel is the presentation of unwanted or unnecessary information. Such writing "terminate[s] focused attention", and is in danger of boring the reader. One view of the encyclopedic novel's method, therefore, is that it requires the reader to practice modulating their attention to the text, bringing more consciousness to the act of filtering the important from the tangential.

Notes

Sources 
 Bersani, Leo. "Flaubert's Encyclopedism". Novel: A Forum on Fiction.  21:⅔  (Winter – Spring, 1988): 140–146
 Boswell, Marshall. "Introduction: David Foster Wallace and 'The Long Thing'". Studies in the Novel 44:3 (2012): 263–266. 
 Clark, Hillary A. "Encyclopedic Discourse". Sub-stance 21.1 (1992): 95–110.
 Herman, Luc. "Encyclopedic novel". Routledge Encyclopedia of Narrative Theory. Routledge, 2010. 137-38.
 Letzler, David. "Encyclopedic novels and the cruft of fiction: Infinite Jest'''s endnotes". Studies in the Novel 44:3 (2012): 304–324. 
 Letzler, David. "The Paradox of Encyclopedic Fiction". 2012. Presented at NeMLA 2012.
 
 
 Reprinted in 

 Further reading 
 Cohn, Dorrit. The Distinction of Fiction''. Baltimore: Johns Hopkins UP, 1999.

Novel forms
Descriptive technique
Encyclopedism
1970s neologisms
1976 in literature